Jasper Packard (February 1, 1832 – December 13, 1899) was an American attorney,  Civil War veteran, and politician who served as a member of the United States House of Representatives for Indiana's at-large congressional district and Indiana's 11th congressional district.

Early life and education
Born in Austintown, Ohio, Packard moved with his parents to Indiana in 1835. He attended local public schools and graduated from the University of Michigan in 1855.

Career 
Packard then taught school and he settled in La Porte, Indiana. He studied law and was admitted to the bar in 1861. During the Civil War, he enlisted in the Union Army as a private in the Forty-eighth Regiment. He was promoted to first lieutenant on January 1, 1862. He served as captain September 12, 1862. He also served as lieutenant colonel of the 128th Indiana Infantry and was promoted to colonel June 26, 1865. He served as the Auditor of La Porte County from November 15, 1866, to March 1, 1869

Packard was elected as a Republican to the Forty-first, Forty-second, and Forty-third Congresses (March 4, 1869 – March 3, 1875). He served as chairman of the Committee on Expenditures in the Department of State (Forty-third Congress), Committee on Private Land Claims (Forty-third Congress).
He was not a candidate for renomination in 1874.

He engaged in newspaper pursuits. He was later appointed commandant of the State soldiers' home at Lafayette, Indiana on July 1, 1899.

Death 
Packard died in Lafayette on December 13, 1899 and was interred in the Soldiers' Home Cemetery.

References
 Retrieved on 2009-5-12

1832 births
1899 deaths
University of Michigan alumni
People of Indiana in the American Civil War
People from Austintown, Ohio
Union Army colonels
19th-century American politicians
Republican Party members of the United States House of Representatives from Indiana